The T.J. Potter was a paddle steamer that operated in the Northwestern United States.  The boat was launched in 1888.  Her upper cabins came from the steamboat Wide West.  This required some modification, because the T.J. Potter was a side-wheeler, whereas the Wide West had been a stern-wheeler.  The boat's first owner was the Oregon Railway and Navigation Company. The T. J. Potter was one of the few side-wheeler boats that operated on the Columbia River.

Design and construction
The T.J. Potter, commonly referred to as the Potter, was named after first the vice president of the Union Pacific Railroad's operations in the west. She was built entirely of wood by the Oregon Railway and Navigation Company, owned by John F. Steffan. She was built for the Oregon Railway and Navigation Company. She was launched at Portland, Oregon in 1888. She was propelled by two non-condensing steam engines, with 32" cylinders, each with an eight-foot stroke, and generating (together or singly is not certain) 1,700 horsepower. Her single boiler and firebox were built in 1887 by the Pusey & Jones Company, of Wilmington, Delaware. Her gross tonnage was 659 and her net tonnage was 589. Her U.S. registry number was 145489.

Construction of the Potter was supervised by Capt. James William Troup, one of the most famous steamboat captains in the West, as well as the owner of the Oregon Railway and Navigation Company, the builders of the T. J. Potter.  On May 26, 1888, the same year the Potter was built, Captain Troup had brought the sternwheeler Hassalo over a six-mile (10 km) stretch of rapids called the Cascades of the Columbia during low water, reaching speeds of  an hour in the process.

When built, the Potter had a reputation as one of the fastest and most luxurious steamboats in the Pacific Northwest:

Operations on the Columbia River
The first season after she was launched, her owners put her on the tourist run from Portland to Astoria, Oregon.  In August 1888, the Potter made the run from Portland to Astoria in 5 hours and 31 minutes.  By comparison, the fastest steamboat on the Columbia River at that time was the Potters competitor Telephone, which on July 2, 1887, had made the  run from Portland to Astoria in 4 hours and 34 minutes.  Fares were $2.50 to Astoria and $3.00 to Ilwaco, Washington. Discounts were offered for the roundtrip.  Lower berths cost $.75 and a single berth cost $.50.  All meals also cost $.50.

Operations on Puget Sound

After that, she was transferred to Puget Sound to compete with another famous steamboat, the Bailey Gatzert, which was owned by the Seattle Steam Navigation and Transportation Company.  The Bailey was a stern-wheeler, and did better in the Sound than the sidewheeler Potter, which rolled from side to side in swells, raising first one paddle wheel then the other out of the water.

Even so, the T.J. Potter was one of the fastest steamboats on Puget Sound, and is reported in 1890 to have bested the famous sternwheeler Bailey Gatzert in a race.  The Potter was also reported to have set a record time of 82 minutes on the run from Seattle to Tacoma. While operating out of Puget Sound, the Potter, along with many other local steamboats, helped fight the Great Seattle Fire of 1889:

Return to Columbia River

Eventually the  Potter was transferred back to the Columbia River for good. She was placed on the Portland-Astoria run, where she competed with steamboats owned by the Shaver Transportation Company.  The Potter'''s owners, Oregon Railway and Navigation Company, struck an anti-competitive deal with Shaver Transportation, whereby the Shaver boats, including the Sarah Dixon, would stay off the Portland-Astoria route in return for a monthly subsidy from Oregon Railway and Navigation Company.  Other competitors of the Potter on the Portland-Astoria run included Lurline and Georgiana.

Captain and crew

In 1901, Joe Turner was the captain of the T.J. Potter.  Other crew at apparently the same time, but whose positions are uncertain, included Al Gray (Faber, cited below, identifies Gray as captain), Julius Oliver, James Healey, Harry O. Staples, Ed Scott, Fred Ware, Claude Cooper, Wendell Smith, and Henry Hoffman.

1901 Rebuild

In 1901 the Potter was rebuilt, increasing her length by only a few feet but greatly increasing her weight.  Her gross tonnage rose from 650 to 1017 tons, and her net tonnage from 590 to 826.Mills, Randall V., Stern-wheelers up Columbia -- A Century of Steamboating in the Oregon Country, page 201, University of Nebraska Press, Lincoln, NE (1947)   The increased weight cut several knots off her speed.  Her wheelhouse was rebuilt, and instead of a flat roof, she had a dome with a flagpole.  This was unique among Columbia River steamboats.  The rebuild cost a total of $86,000.

Following the rebuild, the Potters owners put her on the run from Portland to Ilwaco, Washington for connection with the narrow-gauge Ilwaco Railway and Navigation Company, serving primarily the summer tourist trade.

Later years and abandonment

The Potter was refurbished in 1910, and continued in operation on the Portland–Ilwaco run.  In the early 1990s, Professor Frederick Bracher recalled riding on the Potter from Portland to Ilwaco as a young child in 1915:

Just before the opening of the tourist season in 1916 the Potter was condemned for passenger use.   The Potter was not replaced on the Portland–Ilwaco run, as there was insufficient passenger traffic to justify putting a new boat on the route. The Portland–Astoria route was continued until 1936, when heavy profit losses removed the Georgiana from service.

The Potter then served as a barracks boat for construction crews until Nov. 20, 1920, when her license was revoked. She was abandoned on the northeast side of  Youngs Bay near Astoria.  She was burned and salvaged for her metal shortly afterward.  Faber publishes a photograph showing her abandoned, stripped of upper works, but with her hull substantially intact, with large metal components such as her rudder strap intact.  (Faber, at page 155).

Today
The T. J. Potter has heavily deteriorated over the past 90 years. All that remains are the parts of most of the ribs as well as the keel.  

References

External links
T.J. Potter at wharf of Oregon Improvement Company, sometime between 1888 and 1901.  This photograph shows well the T.J. Potter'' before reconstruction including the ornate paddlewheel boxes.
T.J. Potter on the Columbia River. Photograph from the private collection of Jeff Moore, Stevenson, Washington. Skamania County Heritage Collection from the Stevenson Community Library, Fort Vancouver Regional Library System.

Paddle steamers of Oregon
Ships built in Portland, Oregon
Steamboats of the Columbia River
Sidewheel steamboats of Washington (state)
1888 ships
Oregon Railroad and Navigation Company